Casargo (Valassinese ) is a comune (municipality) in the Province of Lecco in the Italian region Lombardy, located about  north of Milan and about  north of Lecco.

Casargo borders the following municipalities: Crandola Valsassina, Margno, Pagnona, Premana, Primaluna, Taceno, Tremenico, Vendrogno.

References

Cities and towns in Lombardy
Valsassina